Sar Qabrestan may refer to various villages in Iran:

Sar Qabrestan-e Olya Shamal
Sar Qabrestan-e Sofla Shamal